Orthocerus is a genus of beetles belonging to the family Zopheridae.

The species of this genus are found in Europe.

Species:
 Orthocerus crassicornis (Erichson, 1845)

References

Zopheridae